Mega Jet is a high speed catamaran operated by Seajets.

History

Mega Jet is one of three 78 m catamarans built by Incat Yards in Tasmania, Australia. Built in 1995 as Cat-Link I, she was later renamed Thundercat 1 and Tarifa Jet.  In 2008, she was sold to Greek ferry operator Seajets and was renamed Mega Jet.

Regular routes
As of 2016, she operates routes between Crete and several Cycladic islands in the Aegean.

In summer season 2017/2018/2019 Mega Jet operated the Islands in the Azores area on charter to Alanticolines

References

External links
78 Metre Wave Piercing Catamaran from incat

Ships of Seajets
Ships built by Incat
Ferries of Greece
Incat high-speed craft
1995 ships